The Floating Dutchman is a 1952 British crime film directed by Vernon Sewell and starring Dermot Walsh, Sydney Tafler and Mary Germaine. It was known as Clue for a Corpse on U.S. TV. The film was an early product of Merton Park Studios, a British company best known for its Edgar Wallace Mysteries of the 1960s. Its plot involves Dermot Walsh as a Scotland Yard detective who goes undercover amongst jewel thieves after a dead Dutchman is found floating in the river. It is based on a 1950 novel of the same title by Nicholas Bentley.

The title is a pun on the famous ship, the Flying Dutchman.

Plot

A dead Dutchman is found floating in the Thames.  The police know he has been missing for a week and was connected to a notorious London fence.

Philip Reid, a musician, is ejected from a club owned by Mr Skinner for being drunk on the job, and put in a taxi. Mr James who had been talking to Skinner follows him out and joins him in the taxi with his sister Rose, who is a hostess at the club. At his flat he informs Philip that he was flashing a stolen cigarette case in the club.

Back in the club Skinner opens his wall safe and removes the items stolen a week before: but one item, the gold cigarette case, is missing - the item Philip had. He tries to deal with Otto, a Jewish fence, who ultimately offers £1000 for the jewels. Later Mr Skinner gets Philip to give the cigarette case back.

James gradually gains the confidence of Skinner, playing the role of a jewel thief. Skinner's sidekick "Snow" White still doesn't trust him.

It is revealed that Skinner has a contact, Rufo, in a posh restaurant nearby, and Skinner gets told when they are in that restaurant so Skinner can rob them. They get a name and Skinner asks James to help them rob the exclusive apartment. The maid disturbs them and they tie her up. James has informed the police and Skinner is arrested, but Snow White is somewhere in the building. Snow White works out that they were betrayed and goes back to the club. He takes Rose to his flat, where she manages to call James and tells him to hurry there.

Meanwhile Skinner escapes from jail.

When Snow White hears someone coming in he presumes it is James and turns off the light. He throws a knife at the figure entering - but it is Skinner.

Cast
 Dermot Walsh as Alexander James
 Sydney Tafler as Victor Skinner
 Mary Germaine as Rose Reid
 Guy Verney as "Snow" White
 Hugh Morton as Inspector Cathie
 James Raglan as Mr. Wynn
 Nicholas Bentley as Collis
 Arnold Marlé as Otto
 Derek Blomfield as Philip Reid
 Howard Lang as Police Gaoler

Critical reception
TV Guide called the film a "below average crime drama." 
BFI Screenonline noted the film began, "with an opening sequence that anticipates Hitchcock's Frenzy (1972)."

References

External links

1952 films
1952 crime films
Films directed by Vernon Sewell
Films based on British novels
British crime films
British black-and-white films
Films scored by Eric Spear
Films set in London
1950s English-language films
1950s British films